The UMass Dartmouth Corsairs football team represents University of Massachusetts Dartmouth in college football at the NCAA Division III level. The Corsairs are members of the Massachusetts State Collegiate Athletic Conference, fielding its team in the Massachusetts State Collegiate Athletic Conference since 2014. The Corsairs play their home games at Cressy Field in  Dartmouth, Massachusetts.

Their head coach is Josh Sylvester, who took over the position in 2023.

History
It was announced in the late 1960s that UMass Dartmouth, then Southeastern Massachusetts University, would establish a football squad in the coming years. The UMass Dartmouth Corsairs football program played its inaugural season in 1985 off campus at Sargent Field (now named Paul Walsh Field). The team's first coach was Paul Harrison in 1985, and he held the position until 1989. The university hired William Kavanaugh as their head coach in 1990 until his retirement in 2006. The third head coach, Mark Robichaud, was named as Kavanaugh's successor for the 2007 season where he coached until his retirement following the 2022 season. Josh Sylvester, previously an offensive coordinator for the team replaced Robichaud.

Paul Harrison era (1985–1989)
In 1985, Harrison was hired to be their first head coach. He coached the team through its first three years as a club team and then two more years after entering Division III.

In 1988, Harrison led the Corsairs to a 5–4 record, getting his first win against Western New England with the final score being 23–15. The team went on a five-game winning streak beating UMass Boston (35–3), Worcester State (14–7), Bridgewater State (22–9), and Fitchburg State (34–0) before ending the year dropping three in a row to Framingham State (18–26), Westfield State (0–7), and Massachusetts Maritime (6–14).

The following year in 1989, UMass Dartmouth finished with a record of 2–7 and did not win a single of their five games on the road. The teams first win of the season did not come until homecoming night where the Corsairs beat Framingham State 22–18 at home. They finished the year winning one more game against Massachusetts Maritime 30–16 to finish Harrison's last game as a coach for the team.

William Kavanaugh era (1990–2006)
In 1990 Kavanaugh took the job as the UMass Dartmouth head coach and finished his first campaign with the team with a 1–8 record, beating Westfield State on the second to last week of the season, 14–13. The next season, in 1991, Kavanaugh had turned the team around to accomplish a 6–3 record which was good enough for second in the New England Football Conference.

After finishing 5–4 in both 1992 and 1993, the Corsairs finished 8–3 in 1994, their best record in program history up to that point. With a 7–1 conference record UMass Dartmouth was named conference co-champions alongside Maine Maritime and were invited to the team's first postseason appearance in the ECAC Northwest Championship Bowl at Union College. The team lost against Union, 34–14, but as a program it was a large step in the right direction.

The team went 4–6 in 1995 before going 8–2 three consecutive years from 1996 to 1998. Finishing second in the NEFC in 1996 and 1998 and third in 1997. Despite having an 8–2 record for three straight years the team was yet to get a spot in the NCAA Division III Football Championship playoffs. The team went 3–7 in 1999, 5–4 in 2000, and 6–3 in 2001.

In 2002, Kavanaugh led the team to an undefeated regular season record of 11–0. The Corsairs beat their opponents by at least 20 points in all but three outings, including a 44–0 win over Utica on homecoming night. UMass Dartmouth beat Westfield State 16–0 in the NEFC Championship Game to advance into their first ever playoff tournament appearance and postseason appearance since they were co-champions in 1994. The Corsairs lost their first ever tournament appearance 56–6 against the Muhlenberg Mules.

Despite the large loss in the previous year UMass Dartmouth followed their undefeated season with a 9–2 record including a 21–7 victory over Worcester State in the ECAC Northeast Bowl, making the team back-to-back champions. The following year Kavanaugh went 7–4 as the coach and once again went to the ECAC Northwest Bowl, they lost to Ithaca 19–36 in what would be Kavanaugh's last bowl game appearance.

The last two seasons of Kavanaugh's career were average, going 5–5 in 2005 and 5–4 the following year. His final record with the team was 104–64 (.619) including two bowl game victories. He was named NEFC Coach of the Year three times throughout his 17 years with the Corsairs, and is currently still the teams all-time leader in coaching wins and seasons coached. He was inducted into the UMass Dartmouth Hall of Fame in 2011.

Mark Robichaud era (2007–2022) 
In 2007, UMass Dartmouth hired Mark Robichaud to be their next head coach, despite having no prior head coaching experience. In Robichaud's first season with the team they went 5–5. The team started 0–5, but after beating Nichols, 28–7, the team won five straight to finish at an even .500. Over the next ten years the team was consistently below average, reaching as high 6–4 in 2008 and as low as 0–10 in 2009 and 1–9 in 2012.

In 2019, the Corsairs began the season with a 54–7 win over Alfred State and won their first four games of the season before falling to Framingham State 39–33. The team would drop another game to Bridgewater State 56–20 before winning their homecoming game against Worcester State 46–8. The team finished with a record of 7–3, their best since their last Bowl Game appearance in 2004 under Kavanaugh. In 2020, the season was cancelled due to the COVID-19 pandemic.

In 2021, Robichaud and the Corsairs were back to their winning ways after a year off after the cancellation of the 2020 season. Compiling a record of 9–2 enroot to a New England Bowl appearance where the team faced Alfred State. The game ended in a 42–16 win for the Corsairs, their first bowl win since 2003.

In 2022, Robichaud and the Corsairs compiled a 9–1 record on route to a playoff appearance and a MASCAC championship after beating Plymouth State 46–21 in Plymouth. He was also given the Murray Lewis Award, given to an outstanding football coach who positively influenced the game of football. Robichaud was named as the BSN Coach of the Year.

Under Robichaud, UMass Dartmouth has produced 49 all-conference selections, and in 2016 the MASCAC Offensive Player of the Year was junior running back Eddie Sheridan.

On February 1, 2023, Robichaud announced his retirement, as he finished as the school's second all-time leader in coaching wins.

Josh Sylvester era (2023–present) 
On February 1 2023, following Robichaud's retirement, former Corsair offensive coordinator Josh Sylvester took over the position.

Championships

Conference championship
UMass Dartmouth has won three championships, sharing one.

† Co-champions

Division championships
UMass Dartmouth has won two division championships, their first being in the 2002 season and most recently in 2022.

Bowl games
UMass Dartmouth has participated in four bowl games, going 2–2.

Conference affiliations
 New England Football Conference (1991–2012)
 Massachusetts State Collegiate Athletic Conference (2013–present)

List of head coaches

Key

Coaches

NCAA Division III playoff appearances
UMass Dartmouth made two appearances in the Division III playoffs going 0–2.

Year-by-year results

Cressy Field

Cressy Field is a multi-purpose stadium in Dartmouth, Massachusetts, with a seating capacity of 1,850. It is home to the University of Massachusetts Dartmouth Corsairs football, field hockey, lacrosse and track and field teams. The facility opened in 1988.

The field is named after former chancellor Peter H. Cressy.

Notes

References

External links
 

 
American football teams established in 1985
1985 establishments in Massachusetts